The RV Sonne (German for 'Sun') was a former German fishing trawler converted into a research vessel by Schichau Unterweser AG, doing mostly geoscience-related work for a variety of commercial and scientific clients. She was registered in Bremen. In 2015 she was sold to the Argentine institute CONICET and was renamed ARA Austral (Q-21). A new geoscientific research ship, also called RV Sonne, replaced her role in Germany that same year.

Career 
Rickmers Werft built Sonne in 1969 as a stern trawler and delivered her to Hochseefischerei Nordstern. From her homeport of Bremerhaven she operated mainly in the waters around Iceland, Greenland and Labrador.

Sonne was converted for use in a scientific exploration role by Schichau Unterweser AG in 1977 and by Rickmers Werft in 1978. In 1991 Schichau-Seebeck-Werft lengthened and modernized her.

An order worth €124.4 million for a new geoscientific research ship was placed by the German federal ministry for education and research (90%) together with the coastal states Lower Saxony, Schleswig-Holstein, Mecklenburg-Vorpommern, Bremen and Hamburg (10%) in May 2011. The new ship, also called Sonne, was built in Meyer Werft in Papenburg, and replaced the old Sonne in 2015. Its launch took place on 5 April 2014.

The last German cruise of RV Sonne took place in August 2014, after which she was retired from German scientific use.

Argentine service 
She was sold to the Argentinian institute CONICET for € 5.150.000 and she arrived in the Argentine Navy naval base at Mar del Plata in February 2015. In June she was renamed ARA Austral (Q-21). Austral is operated by a naval crew, on behalf of the civilian agency CONICET.

In popular culture 
Sonne appears in Frank Schätzing's novel The Swarm in connection with methane measurements off the Norwegian coast.

See also 

RV Sonne (2014) - the successor of RV Sonne

References

Notes

Bibliography

External links
Sonne homepage (German)
RF Forschungsschiffahrt (homepage of the shipping company operating the Sonne)
Research Vessel Sonne  (by German Marine Research Consortium)
Cruise reports Sonne (list of all cruises with links to cruise reports and data)

Research vessels of Germany
Research vessels of Argentina
1969 ships